Anisostagma is a genus of fungi in the Halosphaeriaceae family. This is a monotypic genus, containing the single species Anisostagma rotundatum.

References

External links
Anisostagma at Index Fungorum

Microascales
Monotypic Sordariomycetes genera